Rockford Township is one of twelve townships in Caldwell County, Missouri, and is part of the Kansas City metropolitan area with the USA.  As of the 2000 census, its population was 478.

Rockford Township was named for a rocky ford within its borders.

Geography
It contains four cemeteries: Cates, Mayes, Sloan and Zeikle.

The streams of Brushy Creek, Crooked River, Spring Branch and Stevenson Creek run through this township.

Transportation
Rockford Township contains one airport or landing strip, Mayes Homestead Airport.

References

External links
 US-Counties.com
 City-Data.com

Townships in Caldwell County, Missouri
Townships in Missouri